Maureen Anne Shea Carranza (born January 11, 1981) is an American professional boxer. She held the WBC interim female featherweight title in 2011 and the IFBA super bantamweight title from 2014 to 2015, and challenged once for the WBA female super featherweight title in 2009. She is known as the "Real Million Dollar Baby" because of her work as the main sparring partner for Hilary Swank in her preparation for the 2004 movie, Million Dollar Baby.

Early life
Maureen was born and raised in the Bronx, New York. Born in 1981, she was raised by a strict Irish father, a now retired NYPD detective. Maureen's mother, of Mexican heritage, worked in the airline industry, allowing Maureen to frequently travel. Moe spent much of her youth growing up in the Bronx and in the Guadalajara, Mexico. In the amateurs, Maureen was known and respected for her boxing. First training out of NYBG with Luigi Olcese, she was eventually brought to Gleasons to train with well respected trainer Hector Roca. It was a gradual process in Shea's growth and preparation for the game of professional boxing.

In 2004, when Hilary Swank came looking for Hector Roca to help her get ready for the movie Million Dollar Baby, Roca paired Swank with Maureen Shea. Maureen was Hilary's main sparring partner in preparation for Swank's award-winning role in the movie. When the international media found out that Swank attended all of Maureen's amateur bouts, Maureen was thrust into the spotlight. It was Maureen's boxing, however, that captured the attention.

Her nicknames include "The Bronx Bombshell", "The Real Million Dollar Baby", and "Moe".

Professional career
Maureen Shea of the Bronx, New York, is the former IFBA Jr Featherweight World Champion, former NABF Festherweight Champion, former NABA Featherweight Champion and former Interim WBC Featherweight Champion. Shea is one of the top professional female boxers in the world.

WBA Super Featherweight Championship
In February 2009, Maureen lost her first world title attempt to Kina Malpartida. This bout was held at the Madison Square Garden in New York, New York.

Interim WBC Featherweight Championship
On December 12, 2011 Shea beat Colombian Diana Ayala to win the Interim WBC Featherweight Champion. This bout was held at the Estadio Centenario in Los Mochis, Sinaloa, Mexico.

NABA Featherweight Champion
On March 15, 2014 Shea beat Nohime Dennison of Albuquerque New Mexico as the Main Event  on Top Players Promotions Ice Vs Fire 2 in Oxnard California to win the vacant NABA featherweight title

IFBA Jr Featherweight World Title
On July 11, 2014 Shea tko'd Angel Gladney of South Carolina to win the IFBA Jr Featherweight World Title. Fighting for the second time as the Main Event on Top Players Promotions Ice vs Fire 3, this was a historical fight being the FIRST ever World Title Fight in Ventura County.

Maureen defended her IFBA world title as the co-feature to the Shane Mosely Vs Ricardo Mayorga main event on August 29, 2015 on Pay-Per-View versus Yulihan Luna of Mexico. This bout resulted in a draw and was the first time a female fight was featured on Pay-Per-View in over a decade.

Maureen has fought as a professional at Madison Square Garden three times, under such distinguished promoters such as Top Rank, Star Boxing, and was the first female to fight on Lou Dibella's Broadway Boxing series. Her fights have been televised on Pay Per View, Azteca Television, Telemundo, Madison Square Garden Network, and SNY.

She has a record of 29-2 (13KO).

Personal life
She has overcome many obstacles, including being the victim of abuse, to achieve her current success. Of Irish and Mexican descent, Maureen has a large fan base of both ethnicities and is a crowd favorite. She currently lives in Oxnard, California and trains at The Boxing Laboratory, home of Vasyl Lomenchenko.

Maureen is a vegetarian.

Million Dollar Baby
Highly recognized for her work as Hilary Swank's main sparring partner for her award-winning role in "Million Dollar Baby", Maureen has utilized her ring success and become successful in mainstream media.

In 2008, Maureen was nominated by MTV as one of their "2008 Toughest Coaches", for her role in their hour long season opening episode of "Made". In that show, Maureen guided a young lady who had no boxing experience; and in six weeks, prepared her for her first competitive amateur bout with a decision win. Later that year she was also nominated by PETA for their Sexiest Vegetarian award.

Maureen has successfully translated her ring experience to ringside, having worked as a boxing analyst alongside highly respected commentators Al Bernstein, and Rich Marotta, on Top Rank "Latin Fury" PPV. She has also guest commentated on the MSG Network during the 2006 NY Golden Gloves, and currently hosts her own live TV show, "Shea's Corner" on Bronx Net Television. Shea has done work as President of Pandora Promotions, Motivational/Inspirational speaker, journalist,TV/radio personality, and Boxing Commentator.

Team Shea
Advisor: Luigi Olcese
Head Trainer: Derik Santos
Cutman: Danny Milano/Carlos Vargas
Strength/conditioning: Phil Daru - Asst. Jose Rojas

See also
List of featherweight boxing champions
List of WBC world champions
List of NABF boxing champions

References

External links

 Maureen Shea official blog
 Robert Ferguson's official website

American boxers of Mexican descent
World boxing champions
World featherweight boxing champions
World Boxing Council champions
1981 births
Living people
American women boxers
Sportspeople from the Bronx
Boxers from New York City
American people of Irish descent